General Greer may refer to:

Edward Greer (born 1924), U.S. Army major general
Elkanah Greer (1825–1877), Confederate States Army brigadier general
Robert Evans Greer (1915–1976), U.S. Air Force major general